Oktyabrsky is a rural locality (a settlement) in Kochyovskoye Rural Settlement, Kochyovsky District, Perm Krai, Russia. The population was 601 as of 2010. There are 15 streets.

Geography 
Oktyabrsky is located 3 km west of Kochyovo (the district's administrative centre) by road. Kochyovo is the nearest rural locality.

References 

Rural localities in Kochyovsky District